The South-West Qiwang, also known as the Xinan Wang, is a Go competition in China.

Outline
The competition is a single-elimination tournament for 16 players. It is played with fast time controls: each player has no main time and five 40-second byoyomi periods, as of the 22nd South-West Qiwang in 2023. Formerly, in 2021 and earlier, each player had 30 seconds to play each move, as well as ten extra periods of 60 seconds.

As of 2023, the winner's prize is 250,000 RMB and the runner-up's prize is 120,000 RMB. This was increased from 2019, when the prize money was 160,000 RMB and 80,000 RMB respectively.

Past winners and runners-up

References

Go competitions in China
Recurring sporting events established in 2002